World Services Group (WSG) is a global multidisciplinary professional services network composed of independent law, accounting and investment banking firms. It ranks as one of the largest among the more than 200 professional service networks in the world. WSG members are independent law, accounting and investment banking firms. According to the organization's website , WSG was formed in 2002 as a multidisciplinary network comprising over 120 member firms in 150 jurisdictions and 23,000 professionals. Its global headquarters are located in the Houston, Texas.

Governance
WSG is a global professional services network of independent firms who represent their own individual client. In WSG, like most of these organizations member firms are highly vetted and are required to be top tier firms. WSG is governed by a board of directors consisting of representatives from each region and from the various services that the members provide. WSG operates and is managed by a staff out of Houston, Texas.

Officers  
Herman H. Raspé, Patterson Belknap - Chair
Anastasia Campbell, Graham Thompson - Chair Elect
André Vautour, Lavery - Secretary
David Gutierrez, BLP -Treasurer
Stefan Erhag, Delphi - Chair Emeritus
Maricarmen Trujillo, World Services Group - Chief Operating Officer

Directors 
The directors are representative of their industry and regions.

Bashir Ahmed, Afridi & Angell (Legal - United Arab Emirates)
Rafael Calvo Salinero, Garrigues (Legal - Spain)
Paul Carlyle, Shepherd and Wedderburn LLP (Legal - Scotland)
Jesus Colunga, Basham, Ringe y Correa, S.C. (Legal - Mexico)
Matthew P. Fisher, Hanson Bridgett (Legal - San Francisco, CA, USA)
Bonnie L. Dixon, Atsumi & Sakai (Legal - Japan)
Shahira Khaled, Al Kamel Law Office (Legal - Egypt)
Xiaoming Li, Han Kun Law Offices (Legal - China)
Jaime Robledo Vasquez, Brigard Urrutia (Legal - Columbia)
Martin Simovart, Cobalt (Legal - Estonia)

Global structure 
WSG is divided into six regions: Africa and Middle East, Asia Pacific, Caribbean, Europe, Latin America, and North America. Each region has a regional Council consisting of five WSG member representatives. All WSG members are recognized as leading independent firms in their region by the top ranking publications and awards including, Members regularly rank in Chambers and Partners, Super Lawyers, Best Lawyers, Legal 500, International Financial Law Review 1000 and other rating organizations.

See also
 Umbrella organization
 Business networking
 Organizational Studies
 Professional services networks

References

Professional networks
International law organizations
International organizations based in the United States